The 1896 Oregon Webfoots football team represented the University of Oregon in the 1896 college football season. It was the Webfoots' third season; they competed as an independent and were led by head coach J. F. Frick. They finished the season with a record of two wins and one loss (2–1).

Schedule

References

Oregon
Oregon Ducks football seasons
Oregon Webfoots football